The Yana  Plateau is a mountain plateau in the Sakha Republic, Far Eastern Federal District, Russia.

The plateau lies in an uninhabited area where solitude prevails. It was first surveyed and mapped in 1868 by Gerhard von Maydell (1835–1894), a Russian government officer in East Siberia of Estonian descent.

Geography  
The Yana Plateau is located in the middle basin of the Yana River. The Yana Plateau is limited by the Nendelgin Range, part of the Chersky Range to the northeast and by the Verkhoyansk Range to the southwest, connecting both mountain regions.

Together with the Elgi Plateau to the south, it is part of the Yana–Oymyakon Highlands with which it forms a tectonic continuum. However, there is no clear geomorphological boundary with the Elgi Plateau.

Hydrography
Generally rivers flow across the Yana Plateau from the south to the north, including the Yana River with its tributary Adycha and its tributaries Derbeke, Nelgese and Tuostakh, as well as the Sartang, Dulgalakh and Bytantay, among others. The Tykakh has its sources in the NW part of the plateau. The middle courses of the Derbeke and the Nelgese, tributaries of the Adycha flowing northwards across the Yana Plateau, have swamps and numerous lakes, including Lake Emanda, the largest lake in the area.

Flora
There are mainly taiga-type sparse larch forests on the plateau.

See also
Oymyakon Plateau

References

External links
Physiogeography of the Russian Far East
Moss flora of the Yana-Adycha Plateau (North-Eastern Yakutia)

Plateaus of the Sakha Republic
Chersky Range
Yana basin
sah:Дьааҥы хаптал хайалара